The World of Concrete is an annual trade show for the commercial construction industry.  It is held each year either in the months of January or February for four days in Las Vegas, Nevada. This event is a show where products, resources, and information related to concrete construction are shared and displayed. More than 1,800 companies and suppliers from all over the world come together in the  Las Vegas Convention Center to show, demonstrate, do business, and answer questions about what they are showing.

Besides the vendors, there are demonstrations and seminars.  The demonstrations are actual work site conditions where attendees can see the product that they are interested in put to the test. Seminars are held throughout the event. There are 90-minute or three-hour sessions to choose from.  Some of the seminars are also certification programs where attendees can be certified in different targeted fields.  Some examples of seminar topics include concrete production, concrete technology, and leadership & management.

Habitual attendees include commercial contractors, concrete contractors, ready mix producers, rental center managers, and concrete pumpers.

Informa Exhibitions acquired the conference from Hanley Wood in 2014.

World of Concrete India 

The 4th edition of World of Concrete India was open from August 10-12, 2017 in New Delhi to welcome suppliers from the commercial concrete and construction industries. The Indian edition is organized jointly by Informa Exhibitions U.S. and Inter Ads Exhibitions Pvt. Ltd. The enthusiastic response from the previous three editions, which drew participation from 100 leading industry suppliers and more than 3,500 professional visitors from India and overseas, has set the pace for the next edition. World of Concrete provides the perfect platform to display your products and solutions to the commercial construction concrete industry during a three-day dynamic and focused business environment.

In keeping with the growing urbanization needs and trends, the Government of India has plans to infuse a massive investment of approximately US $1024 billion during the current 12th Five Year Plan (2013- 2018). As India is modernizing its infrastructure at a fast pace, and concrete is an essential requirement of infrastructural development, it is imperative to have such an event which provides a level playing field for companies in commercial concrete business to showcase innovative technologies and products to modernize the Indian concrete industry. Exhibit your products & technologies and explore business prospects in a focused and dedicated environment for concrete construction.

References

External links
Official website
2007 Photo Gallery

Las Vegas Valley conventions and trade shows
Trade shows in the United States
Construction industry of the United States
Concrete
Annual events in Nevada
Recurring events with year of establishment missing
Annual events in Utah